Michele Rinaldi (born 9 January 1987) is an Italian footballer who plays as a defender for Serie D club United Riccione. A right-footed defender, he is capable of playing both in the centre, or on the right.

Club career

Early career
Born in Manerbio, in the Province of Brescia, Lombardy, Rinaldi started his career at Atalanta. In 2005 Udinese signed Rinaldi (loan), Marco Motta, Cesare Natali, Massimo Gotti, Piermario Morosini and Fausto Rossini from Atalanta, with Thomas Manfredini and Antonino D'Agostino moved to Bergamo. Rinaldi was a player of Udinese's reserve team.

On 9 August 2006 Rinaldi and Christian Tiboni were signed by Udinese in a co-ownership deal for €800,000 and €1.1 million respectively, with Argentine midfielder Fernando Tissone moved to Bergamo also in a co-ownership deal for €1.5 million. In January 2007 Rinaldi was signed by Parma. However, he only able to play for their reserve.

In June 2007 the co-ownerships were renewed.

Rimini
In July 2007 Rinaldi was signed by Rimini in a temporary deal. At the end of season Atalanta bought back Rinaldi and Tiboni for undisclosed fees, with Tissone returned to Udinese for €4.165 million. Rinaldi's residual contact value was also write-down immediately to €600,000 on 30 June 2008, in order to matching the loss of selling Rinaldi in 2008–09 season.

Rinaldi was immediately signed by Rimini in another co-ownership deal. The co-ownership was renewed again in June 2009 and June 2010. However, Rimini went bankrupted, making Rinaldi became a free agent.

Bari
On 16 July 2010 Rinaldi was signed by A.S. Bari on a free transfer.

Lega Pro clubs
On 4 August 2011 Rinaldi was signed by Benevento in a 3-year contract. On 21 May 2013 he was released.

In summer 2013 he was signed by A.C. Pavia. In January 2014 he left for Cuneo in a -year deal. The club relegated to 2014–15 Serie D.

In July 2014 he was signed by Lega Pro newcomer club Savoia. On 2 February 2015 Rinaldi left for A.C. Prato. Prato finished as the 14th, while Savoia relegated.

On 10 September 2015 Rinaldi returned to Cuneo. The club was promoted from 2014–15 Serie D.

On 12 July 2019, he signed with Feralpisalò.

On 11 September 2020 he moved to Imolese on a 2-year contract.

References

External links
 
 
 FIGC 

1987 births
Living people
Sportspeople from the Province of Brescia
Footballers from Lombardy
Italian footballers
Association football defenders
Serie B players
Serie C players
Serie D players
Atalanta B.C. players
Udinese Calcio players
Parma Calcio 1913 players
Rimini F.C. 1912 players
S.S.C. Bari players
Benevento Calcio players
F.C. Pavia players
A.C. Cuneo 1905 players
A.C. Savoia 1908 players
A.C. Prato players
A.S. Gubbio 1910 players
S.S. Arezzo players
U.S. Viterbese 1908 players
FeralpiSalò players
Imolese Calcio 1919 players
A.S.D. Riccione 1929 players
Italy youth international footballers